The 1994 Milan–San Remo was the 85th edition of the Milan–San Remo cycle race and was held on 19 March 1994. The race started in Milan and finished in San Remo. The race was won by Giorgio Furlan of the Gewiss–Ballan team.

General classification

References

1994
March 1994 sports events in Europe
1994 in road cycling
1994 in Italian sport
Milan-San Remo